"Solanum mucronatum" (sometimes called "pepino", which usually refers to S. muricatum) is a flowering plant species in the nightshade family (Solanaceae). It probably belongs to those species formerly in Solanum but nowadays placed in Lycianthes, though its exact identity and name remain undetermined.

It is an annual shrub that is sometimes grown as an ornamental plant. It is also endangered due to habitat loss.

Footnotes

References
  [2008]: "Solanum mucronatum". Retrieved 2008-OCT-01.

External links
Solanum mucronatum info

Lycianthes